Wojciech Kucharski (1741–1819) was a Polish sculptor and mason.

Kucharski is primarily known through his surviving works. In 1788, he made two stone basins for the  St. Adalbert church in Jeleśnia.

References

Polish sculptors
Polish male sculptors
1741 births
1819 deaths